is one of the twelve constriction techniques of Kodokan Judo in the Shime-waza list. Also known as Namijujijime, Danzan Ryu includes this technique in the Shimete list under the name Gyakujujijime.

The technique is called 'normal' because the backs of both hands  of the person applying the choke are facing the person who is applying the choke. The fingers are on top grabbing from the outside of the clothing. The thumbs grab inside underneath the gi or clothing. The hands are high up each side of the neck. Scissoring the hands applies pressure to the carotid arteries reducing blood flow, rapidly resulting in loss of consciousness. In judo, this technique is always taught under supervision and is similarly closely observed by referees in competition.

Technique description

Included systems 
Systems:
Kodokan Judo, Judo Lists
Danzan Ryu, Danzan Ryu Lists
Lists:
The Canon Of Judo
Judo technique

Similar techniques, variants, and aliases 
English aliases:
Normal cross constriction
Normal cross choke
Normal cross strangle
Normal cross lock
Similar: 
Gyaku-Juji-Jime
Kata-Juji-Jime

Judo technique